Jensen Kyra Lüthi (born September 29, 1993) is an artist, entrepreneur and educator living in Switzerland. She started her singing career at the age of 6 being in TV commercials and mall shows. She eventually joined the reality singing search of GMA Network's Protege: The Battle for the Big Break and was later on included as a regular artist in the noontime variety show of the same TV network, Party Pilipinas. She was Entertainment Director of Alphaland Corporation handling both properties: The City Club in Makati and the most exclusive luxury island resort, Balesin Island Club. She is the main host of numerous lifestyle shows on VIVA TV.

In 2019, she founded the #BreakingSilence Movement - a nonprofit organization that empowers survivors of domestic and sexual abuse by creating projects supported renowned philanthropists internationally.

Early life

Jensen Kyra Lüthi has a younger sister named Janine Teñoso who is known as the "OST Princess" in the Philippines. She is not only a performer at a young age but was also a young athlete in swimming.

Jensen Kyra joined numerous singing competitions representing her school since middle school days. One of the most notable singing competitions she joined was the Nationwide Search for PLDT
Singing Idol; in which Asia's Popstar, Sarah Geronimo also joined in her first years of singing career. Although joining every year, she only won the title twice in the year 2010 and 2011. Her first TV show guesting wes on "Walang Tulugan with the Master Showman".

Singing career

2011

She was on TV5's Willing Willie wherein she was the grand winner in the Kantanong Segment. In April, she joined GMA7's Protege: The Battle for the Big Break. After the competition, she signed a contract with GMA Artist Center. She appeared on following TV Shows: Party Pilipinas, Bubble Gang, Unang Hirit.

2012-2016
She went to theater arts and played Cinderella of "Into The Woods" under the production of Trumpets Playshop. She also portrayed Wendy of KIDS ACTS Philippines' "Peter Pan" in Star Theater, Cultural Center of the Philippines. She also performed in Movie Stars Cafe and played various lead roles of musicals such as Gia of Madagascar, Queen Elsa of Frozen, Cleopatra of The Mummy Returns, Sandy of Grease, and Bella Swan of Twilight Musical. In 2015, she was a performer in City of Dreams Manila for a regular show that lasted 6 months. In 2016, she performed at the launch of Miss Universe 2016 held in Manila, Philippines.

2018
She released her first single under VIVA records entitled, LAPIT KA which is available on all digital stores.

Humanitarian Work and Charity
She found her heart in charity in school when her class goes out to the streets to teach and help the homeless. She was also involved with the relief operations of her university's organization dedicated for the victims of typhoon. In 2015, she started her own charity work by being actively involved with Virlanie Foundation Philippines and various other organizations as a teacher. She is also the official representative of the Philippines at the Monaco Charity Film Festival.

In 2019, she founded the #BreakingSilence Movement - a nonprofit organization that empowers survivors of domestic and sexual abuse by creating projects supported renowned philanthropists internationally.

#BREAKINGSILENCE Movement
Jensen Kyra is the founder of the #BreakingSilence Movement - a nonprofit organization that empowers survivors of domestic and sexual abuse by creating projects supported renowned philanthropists internationally.

She is regularly seen at the Anti-Crime Against Women Summit surrounded with the local government authorities, police officers, entrepreneurs and other notable people discussing about the importance of the movement and how it should be addressed nationally.

See also
https://www.manilatimes.net/kyra-luthi-raises-awareness-on-abuse-via-breakingsilence/549541/
https://suedostasien.net/philippinen-die-stille-der-tabukultur-durchbrechen/
https://www.manilatimes.net/2020/08/16/weekly/the-sunday-times/filipino-champions/kyra-luthi-empowers-the-global-filipina/755884/
Jensen at Eumee, nagharap sa Tawag ng Tanghalan!
Jensen at Eumee, nagharap sa Tawag ng Tanghalan!
Metro Manila contender Jensen Kyra sings Jackson 5’s Who's Loving You
Face of Allure: Jensen TeÃ±oso - in the digital version of The Philippine Star
Jensen Teñoso ft Claire dela Fuente - Colors of the Wind - Protege 5th Gala Night
Stand up for love by Jensen Kyra Tenoso
Jensen Teñoso - Footprints in the Sand - Protege 2nd Gala Night
Jensen Teñoso - You and I - Protege 3rd Gala Night
Jensen Teñoso - Stand Up For Love - Protege Face-off round
Jensen Teñoso - You and I - Protege 3rd Gala Night
Jensen Teñoso - Pinilit Kong Limutin Ka - Party Pilipinas

External links

1993 births
Living people
San Beda University alumni
Viva Artists Agency
Viva Records (Philippines) artists
21st-century Filipino singers
21st-century Filipino women singers